Joseph Edward Preston (born November 30, 1956) is an American attorney and politician from the Commonwealth of Virginia. A member of the Democratic Party, Preston represented the 63rd district in the Virginia House of Delegates.

Early life and education 
Preston was born in Omaha, Nebraska, and graduated from Omaha Central High School. He earned a Bachelor of Arts degree from Howard University and a Juris Doctor from the Howard University School of Law.

Career 
Preston ran in the Democratic Party primary election in 1993 against incumbent Jay DeBoer but lost. He ran in a special election, held in January 2015, to fill the seat of Rosalyn Dance, a Democrat who was elected to the Virginia State Senate. Preston then challenged Dance in the June 2015 primary election for the State Senate seat and was defeated.

Personal life 
Preston lives in Petersburg, Virginia.

Electoral history

References

External links

Living people
1956 births
Politicians from Petersburg, Virginia
Democratic Party members of the Virginia House of Delegates